Nicholas "Nick" Brady DePuy (born November 14, 1994) is an American professional soccer player who currently plays as a defender for Major League Soccer club Nashville SC.

Career

College
DePuy played four years of college soccer at UC Santa Barbara between 2013 and 2016, where in 2016 he was named NSCAA Second Team All-Far West Region, Big West Conference Offensive Player of the Year and First Team All-Big West Conference.

While at college, DePuy also played with USL PDL sides Ventura County Fusion.

Professional
DePuy was selected in the first round (19th overall) of the 2017 MLS SuperDraft by Montreal Impact.

DePuy made his professional debut on March 4, 2017, as an 83rd-minute substitute during a 1–0 loss to San Jose Earthquakes. It was announced in May 2017 that he was loaned to the Impact's United Soccer League affiliate, Ottawa Fury FC.

On January 31, 2018, DePuy was loaned out to Fremad Amager in the Danish 1st Division for the rest of the season. The journey only lasted until April 14, 2018, before he picked up an injury and was recalled by Montreal.

On August 16, 2018, DePuy was waived by Montreal.

On March 8, 2019, he signed with the LA Galaxy II.

DePuy appeared on the bench for LA Galaxy's first-team on July 23, 2019, during a 2019 Leagues Cup fixture against Club Tijuana.

On February 5, 2020, DePuy made the move to LA Galaxy's senior team roster.

Career statistics

Club

References

External links
UC Santa Barbara bio

1994 births
Living people
All-American men's college soccer players
American soccer players
Association football forwards
Expatriate soccer players in Canada
Major League Soccer players
CF Montréal draft picks
CF Montréal players
Ottawa Fury FC players
LA Galaxy II players
LA Galaxy players
Nashville SC players
Soccer players from California
Sportspeople from Irvine, California
UC Santa Barbara Gauchos men's soccer players
USL Championship players
USL League Two players
Ventura County Fusion players
Expatriate men's footballers in Denmark
American expatriate soccer players
American expatriate sportspeople in Canada
American expatriate sportspeople in Denmark